Mamunur Rashid (born 29 February 1948) is a Bangladeshi actor, director and scriptwriter. He was awarded Ekushey Padak in 2012 and Bangla Academy Literary Award in 1982 by the Government of Bangladesh.

Early life and education 
Rashid was born on 29 February 1948 in the village Bhabandatta under Ghatail Upazila in Tangail District. He is the eldest of five siblings. He completed his SSC from Bolla Coronation High School.

Career
Rashid moved to Dhaka in 1963. Rashid started writing drama plays in the 1960s. He founded Aranyak in 1972. He served as the chief secretary of the troupe. One of the most notable production of his group is Rarang which deals with the life of Santal. its another production is Ebong Biddyasagar. Another stage play, titled, Che'r Cycle was written and performed by him.

Rashid performed in television plays “Suprobhat Dhaka”, “Somoy Osomoy”, “Ekhane Nongor” and “Pachar”.

Rashid acted in films Monpura (2009), Mrittika Maya (2013) and Nekabborer Mohaproyan (2014).

Rashid performed in radio plays including Kabor (1972) and  Paruler Shangshar (2011).

He performed in Mostofa Sarwar Farooki's web series Ladies & Gentlemen.

Works

Television 
 Kacher Manush (2006)

Films

References

External links
 
 

Living people
1948 births
Bangladeshi theatre directors
Bangladeshi male stage actors
Bangladeshi male film actors
Bangladeshi male television actors
Bangladeshi dramatists and playwrights
Recipients of the Ekushey Padak
Recipients of Bangla Academy Award
Best Performance in a Negative Role National Film Award (Bangladesh) winners